Vigil Peak is located in the Lewis Range, Glacier National Park in the U.S. state of Montana. Lake Isabel is northwest of the peak.

See also
 Mountains and mountain ranges of Glacier National Park (U.S.)

References

Mountains of Flathead County, Montana
Vigil Peak
Lewis Range
Mountains of Montana